The governor of Cesar Department is the popularly elected leader of the department of Cesar in northern Colombia to manage executive functions.

Since the establishment of the Cesar Department on December 21, 1967, governors were appointed by the president of Colombia until the Colombian Constitution of 1991 changed it to election by popular vote.

Governors

See also

List of mayors of Valledupar
List of Colombian department governors

References
 
 Cesar 30 Años de Progreso - Gobernacion del Cesar (1997) booklet

Cesar
Government of Cesar Department